Insentiraja is a genus of skates in the family Arhynchobatidae  commonly known as looseskin skates. The genus contains two known species, both of which occur in deep water in the western-central Pacific Ocean.

Species 
 Insentiraja laxipella (Yearsley & Last, 1992) (Eastern looseskin skate)
 Insentiraja subtilispinosa (Stehmann, 1989) (Velvet skate)

References 
 

Rajiformes
Ray genera
Taxa named by Peter R. Last